Dagum is a surname. Notable people with the surname include:
Camilo Dagum, probability theorist, namesake of the Dagum distribution in probability theory
Estelle Bee Dagum, Argentine and Canadian economic statistician
Paul Dagum, researcher who first developed dynamic Bayesian networks

See also
Bayog, Zamboanga del Sur, a municipality in the Philippines that includes the barangay of Dagum as one of its subdivisions